The 2020 AFC U-23 Championship Final was a football match that took place on 26 January 2020 at the Rajamangala Stadium in Bangkok, Thailand, to determine the winners of the 2020 AFC U-23 Championship. The match was contested by South Korea and Saudi Arabia, the winners of the semi-finals.

South Korea beat Saudi Arabia after extra time and took their first trophy in the contest.

Route to the final

Match

References

See also 
2020 AFC U-23 Championship

2020 AFC U-23 Championship
AFC U-23 Championship finals
South Korea national football team matches
Saudi Arabia national football team matches
Football competitions in Thailand
Sport in Bangkok
January 2020 sports events in Asia